Spain has participated in the Eurovision Song Contest 61 times since making its debut in . Spain has competed in the contest continuously since the country's debut in 1961. The only country with a longer run of uninterrupted Eurovision appearances is the United Kingdom, ever-present since 1959.

The 1969 contest in Madrid is the only time Spain has hosted the event, since lots were drawn after 1969's four-way tie and the  contest was hosted by the Netherlands.

Since the start of the 21st century, Spain has reached the top 10 seven times, with David Civera finishing 6th, Rosa finishing 7th, Beth finishing 8th, Ramón finishing 10th, both Pastora Soler and Ruth Lorenzo also finishing 10th, and Chanel finishing 3rd. Spain has also failed to reach the top 20 in 10 of the last 17 contests, including for six consecutive contests (2015–21). Spain is the current participating country with the longest active victory drought, with a total of 53 years (1969–2022).

Selection process

Spain has regularly changed the selection process used in order to find the country's entry for the contest, either a national final or internal selection (sometimes a combination of both formats) has been held by the broadcaster at the time. Between 1977 and 1999, Spain's entries were selected internally by TVE. Before that, internal selections and national contests, like Pasaporte a Dublín (Passport to Dublin) in 1971, were alternated.

From 2000, Spain has used various selection formats with different results. In 2000 and 2001, TVE organised a national final called Eurocanción (Eurosong), where the Spanish representative was selected for the contest. From 2002 to 2004, the reality television talent competition Operación Triunfo (the Spanish version of Star Academy) was used to select the entry, a format that renewed the Spanish audience's interest in the contest and brought three top 10 results in a row, until TVE decided not to host any further editions of the series. In 2005, the national final Eurovisión 2005: Elige nuestra canción (Eurovision 2005: Choose Our Song) was organised, where the audience chose their favourite song among a pre-selection made by TVE of unknown artists submitted to them by record labels. The result in the Eurovision final was not good and for 2006, the selection was made internally for the first time since 1999, with a similar result. In 2007, Spain's entry was decided through the Misión Eurovisión 2007 show, with a disappointing result once again.

From 2008 to 2010, the Internet was the key element of the competitions used by TVE to select the Spanish entry. In 2008, the social networking website MySpace was involved in the national final Salvemos Eurovisión (Let's Save Eurovision). A website was created to make it possible for anyone to upload a song and proceed to a televised final if chosen by online voters or an expert jury. The result improved a little, but not much; nevertheless the interest of the Spanish audience was revived again. For 2009, MySpace was still involved in the selection process Eurovisión 2009: El retorno (Eurovision 2009: The Return), although some changes were introduced in the format. The result was the worst in the 2000s (decade): 24th place. In 2010, a similar format, Eurovisión: Destino Oslo, selected the Spanish entry, with the best result since 2004 (15th).

In 2011, Internet voting was scrapped from the new selection method Destino Eurovisión. After a further disappointing result (23rd), for 2012, TVE decided to approach an established act, Pastora Soler, and organise a national final to select her song. A top ten result was achieved for the first time since 2004. The same procedure was repeated in 2013, with El Sueño de Morfeo as the established act, which turned out one of the most disappointing results (25th out of 26 entries) in the country's Eurovision history; some critics, however, blamed a less-than-stellar performance of an otherwise solid song. In 2014, TVE decided to return to a multi-artist national final procedure, called Mira quién va a Eurovisión (Look who's going to Eurovision); five artists were invited to participate by TVE. A top ten result was achieved for the second time in three years.

In 2015, for the first time since 2006, both the artist, Edurne, and the song were selected internally by TVE. On 18 December 2015, TVE announced that it would organise a national final in order to select the Spanish entry for the Eurovision Song Contest 2016. Six acts competed in the national final named Objetivo Eurovisión, and Barei won the selection process. The same format was used in 2017, and Manel Navarro won the selection process; it turned out Spain's first last-place result since 1999.

In 2017, TVE commissioned a new season of Operación Triunfo, which returned to TVE after 13 years, and the series served for the fourth time (after 2002, 2003 and 2004) as the platform to select the Spanish entry for the 2018 contest. The result was disappointing (23rd out of 26 entries), but the 2018 Eurovision final was the most-watched in Spain since 2008. A further season of the talent show chose the Spanish entry for the 2019 contest with another disappointing result (22nd out of 26 entries).

For the 2020 contest, TVE selected the Spanish entry internally, with Blas Cantó and the song "Universo" chosen. Following the cancellation of the contest due to the COVID-19 pandemic, TVE was one of the first four broadcasters (the other were Greece's ERT, Netherlands' AVROTROS and Ukraine's UA:PBC) that confirmed its participation for the 2021 edition with the same artist who would have participated for 2020, in this case Cantó. His 2021 entry "Voy a quedarme" went on to finish in 24th place with 6 points, marking the sixth time in a row that Spain has finished outside of the top 20.

For the 2022 contest, it was announced that TVE would use Benidorm Fest, a revamped version of the Benidorm International Song Festival to select the nation's entry among 13 candidates. The broadcaster signed a contract with the regional government of the Valencian Community to hold the event for four editions. The first Benidorm Fest was won by Chanel with "SloMo", which finished in third place at Eurovision with 459 points, thereby achieving Spain's best Eurovision result since 1995.

Spain and the "Big Five" 
These countries earned this special status by being the four biggest financial contributors to the EBU, and subsequently became known as the "Big Four".  returned to the contest in 2011, thus upgrading the countries to members of a "Big Five".

Interrupted performances 
Only three times in the contest's history has a non-winning entry been allowed to perform again, and in two of these instances, the entries in question were Spanish representatives (the other one being the Italian entry in 1958, "Nel blu dipinto di blu" by Domenico Modugno). The first time this happened to a Spanish representative was in the 1990 contest in Zagreb, when Azúcar Moreno opened the contest with the song "Bandido". The orchestra and the recorded backing track began the song out of sync, which caused the singers to miss their cue. The singers left the stage after a few seconds, and no explanation was given at the time. After a few uneasy moments, the music began correctly and the song was performed in full. Azúcar Moreno and "Bandido" went on to place fifth in the final vote tally, though the juries at the time actually awarded their points after watching the dress rehearsal performances, so the restart did not affect Spain's overall result either positively or negatively.

Twenty years later, at the 2010 contest in Oslo, Spain was drawn to perform second in the running order, and Daniel Diges's performance of "Algo pequeñito" was disturbed by Catalan pitch invader Jimmy Jump. However, Diges performed the song in full, despite the invader's intrusion and subsequent removal from the stage by security personnel, receiving warm applause for continuing from the audience at the Telenor Arena. After Serbia's performance, co-presenter Nadia Hasnaoui announced that, according to the rules, Diges would be given a second chance once all the remaining countries had performed. Nonetheless, the juries ranked the dress-rehearsal performance of "Algo pequeñito" 20th out of 25 with 43 points, whereas the televoting results ranked Spain 12th, with 106 points. The combination of jury and televote results gave Spain a 15th-place finish.

Participation overview

Congratulations: 50 Years of the Eurovision Song Contest

Hostings

Awards

Marcel Bezençon Awards

Barbara Dex Award

Related involvement

Conductors

Heads of delegation

Commentators and spokespersons

Stage directors

Photogallery

See also
Spain in the Junior Eurovision Song Contest – Junior version of the Eurovision Song Contest.
Spain in the Eurovision Dance Contest – Dance version of the Eurovision Song Contest.
Spain in the Eurovision Young Dancers – A competition organised by the EBU for younger dancers aged between 16 and 21.
Spain in the Eurovision Young Musicians – A competition organised by the EBU for musicians aged 18 years and younger.
Spain in the OTI Festival – A competition organised by the OTI (Iberoamerican Telecommunications Organisation) Between 1972 and 2000

Notes and references

Notes

References

External links
 Points to and from Spain eurovisioncovers.co.uk

 
Countries in the Eurovision Song Contest